Nagykőrös is a district in south-eastern part of Pest County. Nagykőrös is also the name of the town where the district seat is found. The district is located in the Central Hungary Statistical Region.

Geography 
Nagykőrös District borders with Cegléd District to the north, Tiszakécske District (Bács-Kiskun County) to the southeast, Kecskemét District (Bács-Kiskun County) to the southwest. The number of the inhabited places in Nagykőrös District is 3.

Municipalities 
The district has 1 town and 2 villages.
(ordered by population, as of 1 January 2013)

The bolded municipality is the city.

Demographics

In 2011, it had a population of 27,977 and the population density was 80/km².

Ethnicity
Besides the Hungarian majority, the main minorities are the Roma (approx. 500), German (150) and Romanian (100).

Total population (2011 census): 27,977
Ethnic groups (2011 census): Identified themselves: 25,043 persons:
Hungarians: 24,008 (95.87%)
Gypsies: 467 (1.86%)
Others and indefinable: 568 (2.27%)
Approx. 3,000 persons in Nagykőrös District did not declare their ethnic group at the 2011 census.

Religion
Religious adherence in the county according to 2011 census:

Catholic – 7,406 (Roman Catholic – 7,368; Greek Catholic – 37);
Reformed – 6,388;
Evangelical – 93;
other religions – 459; 
Non-religious – 5,393; 
Atheism – 236;
Undeclared – 8,002.

Gallery

See also
List of cities and towns in Hungary

References

External links
 Postal codes of the Nagykőrös District

Districts in Pest County